Estonia competed at the 2019 World Aquatics Championships in Gwangju, South Korea from 12 to 28 July.

Open water swimming

Estonia qualified two male and one female open water swimmers.

Men

Women

Swimming

Men

Women

Mixed

References

World Aquatics Championships
2019
Nations at the 2019 World Aquatics Championships